The Great Pacific garbage patch (also Pacific trash vortex and North Pacific Garbage Patch) is a garbage patch, a gyre of marine debris particles, in the central North Pacific Ocean. It is located roughly from 135°W to 155°W and 35°N to 42°N. The collection of plastic and floating trash originates from the Pacific Rim, including countries in Asia, North America, and South America.

Despite the common public perception of the patch existing as giant islands of floating garbage, its low density prevents detection by satellite imagery, or even by casual boaters or divers in the area. This is because the patch is a widely dispersed area consisting primarily of suspended "fingernail-sized or smaller"—often microscopic—particles in the upper water column known as microplastics. The same 2018 study found that, while microplastic dominate the area by count, 92% of the mass of the patch comprises larger objects which have not yet fragmented into microplastics. Some of the plastic in the patch is over 50 years old, and includes items (and fragments of items) such as "plastic lighters, toothbrushes, water bottles, pens, baby bottles, cell phones, plastic bags, and nurdles."

Research indicates that the patch is rapidly accumulating. The patch is believed to have increased "10-fold each decade" since 1945. The gyre contains approximately six pounds of plastic for every pound of plankton. A similar patch of floating plastic debris is found in the Atlantic Ocean, called the North Atlantic garbage patch. This growing patch contributes to other environmental damage to marine ecosystems and species.

History

The patch was described in a 1988 paper published by the National Oceanic and Atmospheric Administration (NOAA). The description was based on research by several Alaska-based researchers in 1988 who measured neustonic plastic in the North Pacific Ocean.
Researchers found relatively high concentrations of marine debris accumulating in regions governed by ocean currents. Extrapolating from findings in the Sea of Japan, the researchers hypothesized that similar conditions would occur in other parts of the Pacific where prevailing currents were favorable to the creation of relatively stable waters. They specifically indicated the North Pacific Gyre.

Charles J. Moore, returning home through the North Pacific Gyre after competing in the Transpacific Yacht Race in 1997, claimed to have come upon an enormous stretch of floating debris. Moore alerted the oceanographer Curtis Ebbesmeyer, who subsequently dubbed the region the "Eastern Garbage Patch" (EGP). The area is frequently featured in media reports as an exceptional example of marine pollution.

The JUNK Raft Project was a 2008 trans-Pacific sailing voyage made to highlight the plastic in the patch, organized by the Algalita Marine Research Foundation.

In 2009, two project vessels from Project Kaisei/Ocean Voyages Institute; the New Horizon and the Kaisei, embarked on a voyage to research the patch and determine the feasibility of commercial scale collection and recycling. The Scripps Institute of Oceanography's 2009 SEAPLEX expedition in part funded by Ocean Voyages Institute/Project Kaisei also researched the patch. Researchers were also looking at the impact of plastic on mesopelagic fish, such as lanternfish.

In 2010, Ocean Voyages Institute conducted a 30-day expedition in the gyre which continued the science from the 2009 expeditions and tested prototype cleanup devices.

in July/August 2012 Ocean Voyages Institute conducted a voyage from San Francisco to the Eastern limits of the North Pacific Gyre north, (ultimately ending in Richmond British Columbia) and then made a return voyage which also visited the Gyre. The focus on this expedition was surveying the extent of tsunami debris from the Japanese earthquake-tsunami.

Sources of the plastic
In 2015, a study published in the journal Science sought to discover where exactly all of this garbage is coming from. According to the researchers, the discarded plastics and other debris floats eastward out of countries in Asia from six primary sources: China, Indonesia, the Philippines, Vietnam, Sri Lanka and Thailand. The study - which used data as of 2010 - indicated that China was responsible for approximately 30% of worldwide plastic ocean pollution at the time. In 2017, the Ocean Conservancy reported that China, Indonesia, Philippines, Thailand, and Vietnam dump more plastic in the sea than all other countries combined. Efforts to slow land generated debris and consequent marine debris accumulations have been undertaken by the Coastal Conservancy, Earth Day, and World Cleanup Day.

According to National Geographic, "80 percent of plastic in the ocean is estimated to come from land-based sources, with the remaining 20 percent coming from boats and other marine sources. These percentages vary by region, however. A 2018 study found that synthetic fishing nets made up nearly half the mass of the Great Pacific Garbage Patch, largely due to ocean current dynamics and increased fishing activity in the Pacific Ocean."

Constitution

The Great Pacific garbage patch formed gradually as a result of ocean or marine pollution gathered by ocean currents. It occupies a relatively stationary region of the North Pacific Ocean bounded by the North Pacific Gyre in the horse latitudes. The gyre's rotational pattern draws in waste material from across the North Pacific, incorporating coastal waters off North America and Japan. As the material is captured in the currents, wind-driven surface currents gradually move debris toward the center, trapping it.

In a 2014 study researchers sampled 1571 locations throughout the world's oceans and determined that discarded fishing gear such as buoys, lines and nets accounted for more than 60% of the mass of plastic marine debris. According to a 2011 EPA report, "The primary source of marine debris is the improper waste disposal or management of trash and manufacturing products, including plastics (e.g., littering, illegal dumping) ... Debris is generated on land at marinas, ports, rivers, harbors, docks, and storm drains. Debris is generated at sea from fishing vessels, stationary platforms, and cargo ships." Constituents range in size from miles-long abandoned fishing nets to micro-pellets used in cosmetics and abrasive cleaners. A computer model predicts that a hypothetical piece of debris from the U.S. west coast would head for Asia, and return to the U.S. in six years; debris from the east coast of Asia would reach the U.S. in a year or less.

The authors estimate that 9% was recycled, 12% was incinerated, and the remaining  are in the oceans and land.

Size estimates
The size of the patch is indefinite, as is the precise distribution of debris because large items are uncommon. Most debris consists of small plastic particles suspended at or just below the surface, evading detection by aircraft or satellite. Instead, the size of the patch is determined by sampling. Such estimates, however, are conjectural given the complexities of sampling and the need to assess findings against other areas. Further, although the size of the patch is determined by a higher-than-normal degree of concentration of pelagic debris, there is no standard for determining the boundary between "normal" and "elevated" levels of pollutants to provide a firm estimate of the affected area.

In August 2009, the Scripps Institution of Oceanography/Project Kaisei SEAPLEX survey mission of the Gyre found that plastic debris was present in 100 consecutive samples taken at varying depths and net sizes along a path of  through the patch. The survey found that, although the patch contains large pieces, it is on the whole made up of smaller items that increase in concentration toward the gyre's centre, and these 'confetti-like' pieces that are visible just beneath the surface suggests the affected area may be much smaller. 2009 data collected from Pacific albatross populations suggest the presence of two distinct debris zones.

In March 2018, The Ocean Cleanup published a paper summarizing their findings from the Mega- (2015) and Aerial Expedition (2016). In 2015, the organization crossed the Great Pacific garbage patch with 30 vessels, to make observations and take samples with 652 survey nets. They collected a total of 1.2 million pieces, which they counted and categorized into their respective size classes. In order to also account for the larger, but more rare debris, they also overflew the patch in 2016 with a C-130 Hercules aircraft, equipped with LiDAR sensors.

NOAA stated:

The overall concentration of plastics was seven times greater than the concentration of zooplankton in many of the sampled areas. Samples collected deeper in the water column found much lower concentrations of plastic particles (primarily monofilament fishing line pieces).

Environmental issues

Debris removal 

The 2012 Algalita/5 Gyres Asia Pacific Expedition began in the Marshall Islands on 1 May, investigated the patch, collecting samples for the 5 Gyres Institute, Algalita Marine Research Foundation, and several other institutions, including NOAA, Scripps, IPRC and Woods Hole Oceanographic Institute. In 2012, the Sea Education Association (SEA) conducted research expeditions in the gyre. One hundred and eighteen net tows were conducted and nearly 70,000 pieces of plastic were counted.

In 2012, researchers Goldstein, Rosenberg and Cheng found that microplastic concentrations in the gyre had increased by two orders of magnitude in the prior four decades.

On 11 April 2013, artist Maria Cristina Finucci founded The Garbage Patch State at UNESCO – Paris in front of Director General Irina Bokova.

On 9 September 2018, the first collection system was deployed to the gyre to begin the collection task. The initial trial of the  "Ocean Cleanup System 001" ran for four months and provided the research team with valuable information relevant to the designing of the "System 001/B".

In 2020, over the course of 2 expeditions, Ocean Voyages Institute again set the record for largest cleanup in the "Garbage Patch" removing  of plastic from the ocean. The first 45-day expedition removed  of plastic  and the second expedition removed  of plastic from the Garbage Patch.

In 2021, The Ocean Cleanup collected  of plastic using their "System 002". The mission started in July 2021 and concluded on October 14, 2021.

Discovery of a thriving ecosystem of life at the Great Pacific garbage patch in 2022 suggested that cleaning up garbage here may adversely remove this plastisphere.

In July 2022, The Ocean Cleanup announced that they had reached a milestone of removing the first  of plastic from the Great Pacific Garbage Patch using "System 002" and announced their transition to "System 03", which is claimed to be 10 times as effective as its predecessor.

In 2022, over the course of 2 summer expeditions, Ocean Voyages Institute removed  of plastic ghostnets, consumer items and mixed plastic debris from the Garbage Patch.

See also 

 Ecosystem of the North Pacific Subtropical Gyre
 Indian Ocean garbage patch
 North Atlantic garbage patch
 Ocean Conservancy
 Plastisphere
 South Pacific garbage patch
 World Cleanup Day

References
Notes

Further reading

 
 
 
 
 
 Density of plastic particles found in zooplankton trawls from coastal waters of California to the North Pacific Central Gyre  – Charles J Moore, Gwen L Lattin and Ann F Zellers (2005)

External links

 Pacific Garbage Patch – Smithsonian Ocean Portal
 "Plastic Surf" The Unhealthful Afterlife of Toys and Packaging: Small remnants of toys, bottles and packaging persist in the ocean, harming marine life and possibly even us by Jennifer Ackerman, Scientific American August 2010
 Plastic Paradise Movie – independent documentary by Angela Sun uncovering the mystery of the Great Pacific Garbage Patch known as the Plastic Paradise
 The source of the garbage patches, pictures
 Irish Examiner article
 
 
 Climate change, meet your apocalyptic twin: oceans poisoned by plastic. Public Radio International. 13 December 2016
 By 2050, the oceans could have more plastic than fish. Business Insider. 27 January 2017.
 
 
 

Marine garbage patches
Pacific Ocean
Plastics and the environment
Articles containing video clips